David Wilton (born 1967 or 1968) is a Canadian politician, who was elected to the Nova Scotia House of Assembly in a by-election on July 14, 2015. He represented the district of Cape Breton Centre as a member of the Nova Scotia Liberal Party.

He also ran for the Liberals in Cape Breton Centre in the 2013 election, losing to incumbent MLA Frank Corbett.

In the 2017 election, Wilton was defeated by NDP candidate Tammy Martin.

Election results

|-
 
|New Democratic Party
|Frank Corbett
|align="right"|3,440
|align="right"|45.29
|align="right"|-33.25
|-

|Liberal
|David Wilton
|align="right"|3,282
|align="right"|43.21
|align="right"|+30.72
|-

|Progressive Conservative
|Edna Lee
|align="right"|873
|align="right"|11.49
|align="right"|+4.14

|}

References

Living people
Nova Scotia Liberal Party MLAs
People from New Waterford, Nova Scotia
21st-century Canadian politicians
Year of birth uncertain
Year of birth missing (living people)